Waiteti (sometimes named Waititi) was a passing loop on the North Island Main Trunk railway (NIMT) in New Zealand, built in 1939 to relieve congestion along a single track block, where the line rises steeply from Te Kuiti on a 1 in 70 gradient for , including curves of  to  radius. From its opening it was under central control from Te Kuiti signalbox. The loop could hold 100 4-wheeled wagons.

Sources vary as to opening and closing dates. On 5 October 1938 a new crossing loop was estimated to cost £8,600. The work was done at the same time the loop at Kopaki was extended, the total cost for both being £19,000. The loop probably opened on 9 December 1939, or possibly 3 December 1939 and closed on 31 March 1987, or, alternatively, as gazetted, January 1939 to 5 May 1977. The station was clearly visible on a 1983 aerial photo. Electrification came in 1988, which allowed for more powerful locomotives, reducing the need for the passing point on the long gradient.

The loop was on the section of line from Te Kuiti to Puketutu, for which the Public Works Department had signed a contract on 9 March 1887 and which opened just over 2 years later.

Waiteti translates to water dripping from the ground. The station was in the valley of the Waiteti Stream.

See also 
Waiteti Viaduct

References

External links 
 Retrolens aerial photos – 1964, 1983

Railway stations in New Zealand
Waitomo District
Rail transport in Waikato
Buildings and structures in Waikato